The 2014 Villanova Wildcats football team represented Villanova University in the 2014 NCAA Division I FCS football season. They were led by 30th-year head coach Andy Talley and played their home games at Villanova Stadium. They were a member of the Colonial Athletic Association. They finished the season 11–3, 7–1 in CAA play to finish in second place. They received an at-large bid to the FCS Playoffs where they defeated Liberty in the second round before losing in the quarterfinals to Sam Houston State.

Schedule

Game summaries

at Syracuse

Fordham

James Madison

at Penn

at Maine

Rhode Island

at William and Mary

Morgan State

at Richmond

Towson

Albany

at Delaware

FCS Playoffs

Liberty (FCS Playoffs Second Round)

Sam Houston State (FCS Playoff Quarterfinal)

Ranking movements

References

Villanova
Villanova Wildcats football seasons
Villanova
Villanova Wildcats football